The President of the Congress of the Republic of Guatemala is the presiding officer of the legislature. Until 1996 the title was President of the National Congress.

Below is a partial list of office-holders:

Chamber of Representatives 1851-1879 
Cámara de Representantes

National Assembly 1879-1945 
Asamblea Nacional

Congress since 1945 
The title 1984 - 1986 was President of the National Constituent Assembly

References 

Various editions of The Europa World Year Book

 
Guatemala, Congress